Netrocoryne is a genus of skipper butterflies (family Hesperiidae). It belongs to the tribe Tagiadini of subfamily Pyrginae.

Species include:
 Netrocoryne repanda

References 

Tagiadini
Hesperiidae genera
Taxa named by Baron Cajetan von Felder
Taxa named by Rudolf Felder